Sofía Sprechmann Sineiro (born 1969) is a Uruguayan humanitarian and the Secretary General of the development charity CARE International. She lives in Ecuador.

Education 
Sprechmann was born in January 1969 and she is a Uruguayan citizen. She holds a bachelor of arts's degree in sociology from the Universidad de la República Oriental del Uruguay and a master's of science degree in Epidemiology from the London School of Hygiene and Tropical Medicine.

Career 
Sprechmann Sineiro has worked in international development since 1994. Based in Ecuador, Sprechmann Sineiro has served as Secretary General at CARE International since 2020, taking over from Lindsay Glassco as of 1 June 2022. She has worked for CARE for over thirty years including as the Program Director for the CARE International Secretariat.

Gender equality 
Sprechmann Sineiro was integral to placing women and gender justice at the heart of CARE International’s work.

Climate change 
Writing for the Thomson Reuters Foundation in 2022, Sprechmann Sineiro highlighted the gendered impact of climate change and climate migration. She said that change would affect women 80% of the time and they would bear the brunt of forced migration. Sprechmann Sineiro noted that the conditions that force migration can be mitigated as it is not always inevitable. However when it cannot be avoided then planning can reduce the effects of domestic violence and food shortages that can be disproportionally shared by gender.

COVID-19 pandemic 
In response to the COVID-19 pandemic, Sprechmann Sineiro called on international non-governmental organisations for more cohesive, coherent responses between the international development and humanitarian sectors. She noted that the pandemic saw a decrease of aid towards those most vulnerable to the pandemic.

References 

Living people
Uruguayan sociologists
Alumni of the London School of Hygiene & Tropical Medicine
University of the Republic (Uruguay) alumni
1969 births
Uruguayan humanitarians
Uruguayan emigrants to Ecuador